The Performo Toy Company was established in 1925 by Torrence Leroy Dietz, in Middletown, Dauphin County, Pennsylvania. They manufactured wooden toys in a building on North Spring Street. His business expanded rapidly, soon recruiting over 25 employees, and still having trouble filling demands for their popular toys. The corporation documents confirm the president of the toy company was Torrence Dietz and that Rene Grove was the chief designer and one of five partners. The company was capitalize with an initial stock offering of twenty-five thousand dollars. The original partners were Torrence Dietz, president (and salesperson), O.H. Watts, manager and treasurer, Clifford Funk, initially the secretary, and Rene Grove, principal artist and designer, and Elias Klahr, investor. (source financial records)

The company had a catalog of around 40 different toys, all of them distributed by the George Borgfeldt Company, including its most popular doll, a black and white mouse named Micky (US Patent #D70,840, received on August 17, 1926).

Rene Grove's younger brother, Larry Grove worked at the factory. After the mouse was created, Performo had a "Name the Mouse" contest. Larry submitted the name Micky and won the contest.

Mickey Mouse vs. Micky Mouse debate

Mickey Mouse is one of the most loved cartoon characters in the history of animation industry.

The similarities between both mice have led to speculation that Walt Disney stole his most successful idea from the Performo Toy Company. The wooden mouse was very popular in New York City (where Performo's distributor was located) in 1928. Coincidentally, at about the same time, Disney thought of the idea for his animation studio's new character and began drafting cartoons, which then aired as shorts, padding the time between one film and the next, and were extremely popular. Other shorts included newsreels, which showed film of events from around the world, much as does a nightly news broadcast in the heyday of television broadcasting. 

There is a well known legend in Middletown about how Performo Toy Company sued The Walt Disney Company, which included some coverage in the local paper. A conspiracy theory might have arisen from this story, however, History Detectives, a television program on PBS, conducted an extensive investigation on the topic. The historians and researchers of the PBS program conducted a nationwide search, finding that there are no records nor evidence of any legal action between the two parties. Inquiries to Disney historians and archivists resulted in a letter stating that no such action had ever existed between the companies. Hence the legend is dismissed as local gossip made urban myth.

Part of the program showed that Performo's Micky, while very close to Walt Disney's, actually grew more that way after the cartoon's success. Performo's Micky Mouse, without the "e", suddenly developed red shorts with white buttons, as was shown by a Mickey collector who had both products in his multi-room collection. The program's investigating historian concluded that it was a series of generic mice that featured in  Felix the Cat (1922), Milton Mouse from Aesop's Film Fables (1920) or Ignatz Mouse from Krazy Kat (1914), which provided the inspiration for Mickey Mouse. When viewed side by side and in sequence of appearance, an evolution of the many mice in cartoons of the era is striking, if not conclusive.

Further, in 1932 the sales of Mickey Mouse toy paraphernalia out-grossed the revenues for the films themselves, the first time that happened in the experience of Hollywood. At nearly the same time, Performo came onto hard times despite its rapid growth and filed for bankruptcy in 1933. The PBS historian concludes it became a victim of the depression like many other toy companies and other luxury goods producers while the movie tie-in enabled Disney's nascent toys and novelties business to weather the hard times of the Great Depression.

The Simpsons episode "The Day the Violence Died" bears a remarkable similar story line to the Grove–Disney debate.

Bankruptcy

In the July 15, 1933 edition of the Press and Journal, the Performo Toy Company announced they were filing for bankruptcy. It is believed that the Great Depression forced them to padlock their doors.

See also
Mickey Mouse
The Walt Disney Company

References

Further reading
 Broken Toy: A Man's Dream, A Company's Mystery by Craig L. Andrews.  - resource book tracing origin of Micky Mouse and Mickey Mouse.Book Press Release

External links
United States Patent and Trademark Office, United States Patent - D70,840, Issue Date - August 17, 1926, Current U.S. Class - D21/585, Animal Toy, Filed by Rene D. Grove
Performo Toy Company
History of Micky Mouse
 PBS - History Detectives - Case 302 - Mouse Toy
Toy resource guide
Central PA Magazine - Country Mouse, City Mouse
Performo/Rene Grove website

Toy companies of the United States
Companies based in Dauphin County, Pennsylvania
American companies established in 1925
1925 establishments in Pennsylvania